Bailey-Boushay House, founded June 24, 1992, is an inpatient long-term care facility and outpatient day health program for people with HIV/AIDS in Seattle, Washington, USA. It is an affiliate of Virginia Mason Medical Center.

History 
Bailey-Boushay House was the first inpatient hospice facility for AIDS patients in the United States. It was founded by Betsy Lieberman and Christine Hurley of AIDS Housing of Washington with support from sources including Virginia Mason Medical Center, Boeing, Nordstrom, Weyerhaeuser, the Northwest AIDS Foundation, and an anonymous donation of $100,000 via the Archdiocese of Seattle. The facility was created as a response to the lack of skilled nursing facilities available for AIDS patients. Its planned location in the Madison Valley neighborhood drew opposition due to concerns about the proposed outpatient population. At the time, a member of the facility's opposition was on the board of the Seattle Art Museum. In May 1990, the Seattle chapter of ACT UP scheduled a shutdown of the museum construction site to show support for local AIDS patients, but two days before the shutdown the opposition relented. The facility was named after Seattle publisher Thatcher Bailey, a founding donor, and his partner Frank Boushay, who died of AIDS in 1989. Bailey-Boushay House was dedicated on January 12, 1992. By 1992, over 2,000 cases of AIDS had been diagnosed in King County, with 90% of the cases present in men who have sex with men. In the first years at Bailey-Boushay, patients would often arrive from hospitals only a few days before their death from AIDS-related complications.

In the early 1990s, the photographers Saul Bromberger and Sandra Hoover documented the daily life of Bailey-Boushay patients, and their work was published in Mother Jones magazine on World AIDS Day in 2014.

Every year on Valentine's Day, Bailey-Boushay House used to place hundreds of red balloons on the outside of their facility to officially thank the community for their support.

Current work 
As of 2017, due to the significant decrease in death rates from HIV/AIDS due to antiretroviral therapy, the 35-bed inpatient program at Bailey-Boushay House serves patients with a variety of life-threatening diagnoses, such as amyotrophic lateral sclerosis and Huntington's disease, providing long-term, respite, and end-of-life care. The outpatient day health program serves patients with HIV who are homeless, and/or capable of living independently in the community but require medication management and social support. Bailey-Boushay House plans to open a 50-bed overnight shelter to promote housing stability for its outpatient clients, with a projected opening date of November 1, 2018.

Over the past two years, the Daily Outpatient Program has exploded from 100 outpatients to over 400 outpatients. This fact, combined with the complexities of opening a new overnight shelter for the homeless, is causing prolonged increasing strain to the Daily Outpatient Program, resulting in the loss of events regularly provided to benefit the Outpatients' health and enriching their lives [as of Oct. 2018].

Notes

External links 
 Bailey-Boushay House, official site
 Photos of the First AIDS Hospice Center Tell a Story of Struggle and Resilience, photo essay in Mother Jones magazine, December 2014

Residential buildings in Seattle
HIV/AIDS in the United States
Nursing homes in the United States
Non-profit organizations based in Seattle
Homeless shelters
Homeless shelters in the United States
Patient advocacy
Patient reported outcome measures
Patient safety
1992 establishments in Washington (state)